Stilbum cyanurum, is a large Old World species of cuckoo wasps (insects in the family Chrysididae).

Description
The colour range of this widespread species is considerable, with typical specimens mostly bluish green to bluish-violet, but varying to reddish gold.

Biology
These wasps lay their eggs in the nests of various potter wasps (Delta unguiculatum, Katamenes arbustorum), sphecid wasps (Sceliphron caementarium, Sceliphron destillatorium and Sceliphron madraspatanum), and  megachilid bees (Megachile).

Distribution
This widespread species is present in southern Europe, North Africa, the Afrotropical Region, Australian Region, East Palearctic ecozone, Near East, and Oriental Region.

References 

Insects described in 1771
Chrysidinae
Insects of North Africa
Taxa named by Johann Reinhold Forster